Yorke Island may refer to:

Yorke Island (Queensland) aka Masig Island
Yorke Island Airport
Yorke Island (Canada), in the Johnstone Strait area of the Coast of British Columbia